Route 56, also known as Kuhio Highway, is the main highway on the north and east shore of Kauai island in Kauai County, Hawaii, United States.

Route description

Route 56 runs , stretching from Hawaii Route 50 at the junction of Rice Street in Lihue to the junction of Hawaii Route 560 in Princeville on the island of Kauai. The road is named for Prince Jonah Kūhiō Kalaniana'ole, a territorial delegate to Congress after Hawaii's annexation by the United States.

The road is a major thoroughfare for the eastern and northern parts of Kauai. Leaving Lihue, the road passes through the only Walmart and the major hospital on the island. The road connects with Hawaii Route 51 to Lihue Airport. Following the intersection the road briefly passes through some rural patches with the occasional resort before crossing the Wailua River. At the Wailua River, there is a two-lane southbound bridge and a two-lane northbound bridge. A bridge expansion was completed in 2011. Going through Wailua and Kapaa, Hawaii 56 is jammed in the morning and the afternoon. Contra flow alleviates rush-hour traffic in the morning between Kapaa and Lihue Airport. The southbound lane gets two lanes in the morning to alleviate traffic pressures. Contra flow traffic starts at 6 a.m. on weekdays and 8 a.m. Saturday. Traffic is switched back to normal starting from the north at 11 a.m. weekdays and 1:30 pm on Saturday. The traffic pressure dissipates going through some of the most gorgeous scenic countryside with few services and buildings from Kapaa heading toward Princeville. The bridge over the Kalihiwai river west of Kilauea is particularly scenic.

Major intersections

See also

 List of state highways in Hawaii
 List of highways numbered 56

References

External links

 Roads of Kauai
 Photos of Kuhio Highway

Transportation in Kauai County, Hawaii
0056